Iván Massagué Horta (born 4 September 1976) is a Spanish actor.

Biography 

Between 1996 and 1999 Massagué studied in the school of theatre “Nancy Tuñón” in Barcelona.
Although he had been working for some years as an actor, he rose to prominence with his interpretation of Johnny in the last part of the TV series called Siete Vidas (Seven Lives). Later, he starred as Marco in La Familia Mata (The Family Kills) and, thereafter, as Burbuja in the TV series El barco.

Massagué also starred in the Spanish film Pancho, el perro millonario, a family comedy. The film was released on 6 June 2014. In the same year, he starred in La mujer de negro (The Woman in Black), directed by Emilio Gutierrez Caba.

After the ending of the TV series El Barco, Massagué will be the main character of a new sitcom on Cuatro called Gym Tony, with Antonia San Juan and Usun Yoon, among others.

He appeared in the third season of MasterChef Celebrity. He was the fourth contestant to be eliminated.

Filmography

Movies

TV

Short films

Theatre

Awards

References

External links

 
 Iván Massagué in Solo Para Ti
 Entrevista y entrega del OMGAward

Spanish male television actors
Living people
1976 births
Male actors from Barcelona
21st-century Spanish male actors